Scary Stories to Tell in the Dark is a 2019 horror film directed by André Øvredal, based on the children's book series of the same name by Alvin Schwartz. The screenplay was adapted by The Hageman Brothers, from a screen story by producer Guillermo del Toro, as well as Patrick Melton and Marcus Dunstan. The film, an international co-production of the United States and Canada, stars Zoe Colletti, Michael Garza, Gabriel Rush, Austin Zajur, Natalie Ganzhorn, Austin Abrams, Dean Norris, Gil Bellows, and Lorraine Toussaint.

In 2013, CBS Films acquired the rights to the book series from 1212 Entertainment with the intent of producing it as a feature film. By January 2016 it was announced that del Toro would develop and potentially direct the project for CBS Films. Øvredal was later set to direct the film, with del Toro, Daniel, Brown, and Grave being among the producers. Principal photography commenced on August 27, 2018, and ended on November 1, 2018, in St. Thomas, Ontario, Canada.

Scary Stories to Tell in the Dark was theatrically released on August 23, 2019, in the United States by Lionsgate. The film was well received by critics with praise for its depictions of the horror features from its source material, and went on to gross $105 million at the box office, becoming a financial success. A sequel is in development.

Plot
On Halloween 1968, in the Pennsylvania town of Mill Valley, three teenagers, Stella, Auggie, and Chuck, prank bully Tommy Milner. When Tommy and his gang chase them in retaliation, the three take refuge in the car of young drifter Ramón Morales. They conclude Halloween by visiting the supposedly haunted former home of the wealthy Bellows family, who owned the local paper mill. Inside, they find a book of horror stories written by Sarah Bellows, the Bellows' young daughter who was accused of witchcraft when the town's children mysteriously began to die; she allegedly committed suicide. Tommy locks the group inside along with Ruth, Chuck's sister. They escape, and Stella takes Sarah's book.

Back home, Stella discovers that a new story, entitled "Harold," has appeared on a page that was blank moments before. In a nearby cornfield, an inebriated Tommy is stalked by the titular Harold, his family's scarecrow, after it comes to life. He notices that Harold continuously moves towards his location. Harold starts walking towards him; Tommy bolts. But when he runs smack into Harold, the creature stabs him with a pitchfork, causing Tommy to vomit hay and undergo a violent transformation. Tommy is reported missing; Stella and Ramón find Harold dressed in Tommy's clothes. Stella is convinced that Tommy has been turned into a scarecrow.

A new story titled "The Big Toe" appears; the protagonist, Auggie, is kidnapped by a corpse searching for its missing toe, which is inside a stew that Auggie unwittingly eats. Auggie is then dragged under his bed by the corpse and disappears. After the remaining friends vainly attempt to destroy the book, they research Sarah's life. A new story, "The Red Spot", is written. Ruth is sitting in the backstage room, getting her makeup ready for the play, starts poking at a swollen spider bite on her cheek, which explodes and releases hundreds of tiny spiders. Ruth is rescued but is traumatized, and the play is cancelled. 

The group's investigation takes them to the elderly Lou Lou Baptiste and they learn that Sarah did not die in the Bellows' House, like many believed, she hanged herself in the hospital where her brother, Dr. Ephraim Bellows, was her doctor. They head to a local hospital, where they discover that Sarah's brother performed electroshock therapy on her as part of a cover-up and to get Sarah to confess to killing the children. The family's mill had been poisoning the town's water with mercury, leading to the deaths of the town's children and Sarah was tortured by her family for trying to reveal the truth. To avoid suspicion, they blamed her for the deed. Chuck, while trying to evade hospital security, accidentally triggers an alarm, bathing the hallways in red light. Stella begins to narrate a story with Chuck as the main character. Chuck is then attacked and cornered by the Pale Lady, a phantom from his nightmares, who absorbs him.

Stella and Ramón are arrested for trespassing by Police Chief Turner, who reveals that Ramón is a Vietnam War draft dodger. Ramón reveals that it was out of fear after his brother enlisted and his dead body was returned to them in pieces. A head falls down the chimney; more body parts follow. Ramón realizes that the next creature is called the Jangly Man, a monster from a story called "Me-Tai-Do-Tee-Walker" that frightened him as a child. The Jangly Man snaps Turner's neck; Ramón and Stella escape and run to the Bellows house for answers. Stella is taken back in time while Ramón tries to evade the Jangly Man. Living out Sarah's experience of the torture, Stella promises Sarah that she will tell the truth of her innocence if she stops harming people. Stella writes down the true story in blood, and Sarah and all of her monsters vanish.

Stella writes the truth about Sarah's life in the papers, keeping her promise. Ramón accepts his enlistment and shares an emotional goodbye with Stella before he leaves for the war. With Ruth recovered, Stella states that she will find a way to rescue Chuck and Auggie.

Cast

 Zoe Colletti as Stella Nicholls
 Michael Garza as Ramón Rodriguez
 Gabriel Rush as August "Auggie" Hilderbrandt
 Austin Abrams as Tommy Milner
 Dean Norris as Roy Nicholls
 Gil Bellows as Police Chief Turner
 Austin Zajur as Charlie "Chuck" Steinberg
 Natalie Ganzhorn as Ruth "Ruthie" Steinberg
 Lorraine Toussaint as Louise "Lou Lou" Baptiste
 Ajanae Stephenson as Young Louise Baptiste
 Kathleen Pollard as Sarah Bellows
 Deborah Pollitt as Mrs. Steinberg
 Victoria Fodor as Mrs. Milner
 Marie Ward as Mrs. Hilderbrandt
 Mark Steger as:
 Harold the Scarecrow
 The Pale Lady
 Javier Botet as the "Big Toe" corpse
 Troy James as the Jangly Man
 Kyle Labine as Deputy Hobbs
 David Tompa as a doctor
 Karen Glave as Claire Baptiste
 Stephanie Belding as a reception nurse
 Hume Baugh as Deodat Bellows
 Jane Moffat as Delanie Bellows
 Will Carr as Ephraim Bellows
 Amanda Smith as Gertrude Bellows
 Brandon Knox as Harold Bellows
 Rodrigo Fernandez-Stoll as a drive-in manager
 Anna Fraser as an actress
 Alex Spencer as an orderly
 Matt Smith as Mr. Steinberg
 Colton Gobbo and Daniel Gravelle as lettermen

Production
In 2013, CBS Films acquired the rights to the Alvin Schwartz children's book series Scary Stories to Tell in the Dark from 1212 Entertainment, with the intent of producing it as a potential feature film. It was announced in 2014 that writer John August had been set to pen a film version.

On January 14, 2016, it was announced that Guillermo del Toro would develop the film, as well as possibly direct, and that he would also produce along with Sean Daniel, Jason Brown, and Elizabeth Grave, with Roberto Grande and Joshua Long executive producing. In February 2016, CBS Films hired screenwriting brothers duo Dan and Kevin Hageman to polish the draft written by August. In December 2017, it was reported that André Øvredal would direct the film. The Hagemans received final screenplay credit, with del Toro, Patrick Melton, and Marcus Dunstan receiving "story by" credit. CBS Films co-financed with Entertainment One.

In August 2018, Zoe Colletti, Michael Garza, Austin Abrams, Gabriel Rush, Austin Zajur, and Natalie Ganzhorn joined the cast. In September 2018, Dean Norris, Gil Bellows, Lorraine Toussaint, and Javier Botet were added as well. Principal photography commenced on August 27, 2018, and ended on November 1, 2018, in Hamilton, Ontario.

In July 2019, at the San Diego Comic-Con, del Toro explained why Scary Stories to Tell in the Dark was not produced as an anthology film:

Music

The film features an original score by composers Marco Beltrami and Anna Drubich. In addition to the original music, period songs from the 60s are heard in the film, such as "Season of the Witch" by Donovan, which plays during the film's opening.

A cover of "Season of the Witch" by musician Lana Del Rey is heard in the closing credits to the film and was featured in a trailer for the film.  While talking about his choice to have Del Rey sing the cover for the film, del Toro stated, "I have admired Lana's music for a while now and felt in my gut that she would run with 'Season of the Witch' – that she would use her alchemy to transform it. She is a great artist and has been an amazing partner with us in this adventure. It is an honor for me to have met her." Del Rey's version of the song was released for digital download and streaming on August 9, the same day as the film's premiere.  Mirko Parlevliet of Vital Thrills praised the pairing of Del Rey's sound and the film's vintage aesthetic. Savannah Sicurella of Paste stated, "Del Rey managed to capture the prickly, macabre feeling of the popular Alvin Schwartz stories on which the film was based."

Marketing
The first footage of the film premiered during Super Bowl LIII. The first trailer was released on March 28, 2019, and the second on June 3, 2019. On August 5, 2019, a third trailer was released, featuring a cover version of the Donovan song "Season of the Witch", by Lana Del Rey, performed for the film's soundtrack. All-in-all, the studio spent over $20 million promoting the film.

Release

Theatrical
The film was originally set to be theatrically released in the United States on August 9, 2019, by CBS Films via Lionsgate, but the film was  pushed back two weeks later, to August 23.

Home media
Scary Stories to Tell in the Dark was released in the US on digital download by Lionsgate Home Entertainment on October 22, 2019, and also on Ultra HD Blu-ray, Blu-ray, and DVD on November 5.

Reception

Box office 
Scary Stories to Tell in the Dark grossed $68.9 million in the United States and Canada, and $35.6 million in other territories, for a worldwide total of $104.5 million.

In the United States and Canada, Scary Stories to Tell in the Dark was released alongside The Kitchen, Dora and the Lost City of Gold, The Art of Racing in the Rain, and Brian Banks, and was projected to gross $15–17 million from 3,000 theaters in its opening weekend. The film made $8.8 million on its first day, including $2.33 million from Thursday night previews. It went on to debut to $20.8 million, finishing second, behind holdover Hobbs & Shaw. It dropped 52% in its second weekend to $10.1 million, finishing fifth.

Critical response 
The site's critical consensus reads, "Like the bestselling series of books that inspired it, Scary Stories to Tell in the Dark opens a creepy gateway into horror for younger genre enthusiasts." Metacritic gave the film a weighted average score of 61 out of 100, based on 33 critics, indicating "generally favorable  reviews." Audiences polled by CinemaScore gave the film an average grade of "C" on an A+ to F scale, while those at PostTrak gave it an average 3 out of 5 stars and a 53% "definite recommend."

Owen Gleiberman of Variety wrote that "the movie faithfully re-creates the peak moments of half a dozen of Schwartz' most popular stories," but "doesn't totally embrace the Gammell vision," referring to the infamy of the illustrations in the original book series. Ben Kenigsberg of The New York Times called the film "an agreeable bit of fan service."

Keith Uhlich of The Hollywood Reporter conversely termed it a "lackluster adaptation," adding that the monsters depicted in the film are "scary," though "they'd be much more so if they felt less like franchisable IP and more like fervent expressions of the ills of the eras on which the film aims to comment." William Bibbiani of Bloody Disgusting wrote that the film "often works very well for several, breathless minutes at a time. But in between those excellent scares there's a lot of filler, a lot of perfunctory plotting and a lot of mediocre character development." Alan Jacques of Limerick Post gave the film two points out of five and stated "This movie is definitely not meant for a pre-teen audience. There are one or two genuinely creepy moments that would leave your precious nippers sleeping with the lights on until they finish college.... For a young audience coming to horror for the first time, this isn’t a bad place to start, but for anyone with a real appreciation of the genre this might feel rather dull and unoriginal." In his review for The Verge, Noah Berlatsky stated "...Scary Stories is remarkably insightful and sober in its assessment of the way stories control people, rather than the other way around. Quentin Tarantino’s Once Upon a Time in Hollywood was supposed to be the summer’s virtuoso meta-fiction, but its rewritten happy ending, musing on the impotence of writing, seems a lot less bleak than Scary Stories’ acknowledgment that some scripts will take you far away where you'll never be seen again."

Tomris Laffly of RogerEbert.com gave the film three stars out of four, stating "Still, Scary Stories is a strangely uplifting throwback to old-fashioned clans of investigative teens. While it doesn’t break any new ground, there is plenty of vintage fun to be had with kids who feel their way through life’s impending fears and live to tell the tale." Writing for The Guardian, Simran Hans gave the film three stars out of five, noting "Producer and co-writer Guillermo del Toro brings Alvin Schwartz’s much-loved children’s book series to the big screen, but this uneven film can’t decide who it’s trying to scare." The New Yorkers Richard Brody mentioned "There’s authentic charm to the fine-grained didacticism of the plot of “Scary Stories,” which embodies the very virtues that it promotes. In the process of displaying the redemptive power of factual knowledge, however, the movie flattens and tames the power of imagination." David Ehrlich of IndieWire added "André Øvredal’s film adaptation, as clever and well-crafted as it is, can’t help but invert the formula that the source material relied upon for its success. Here is an R-rated concept that’s been watered down until it passed for a PG-13 movie; it’s plenty harrowing and full of gruesome effects, but it never feels dangerous." The Atlantics Julie Beck noted "The best scary stories do that—they get under your skin and emerge again and again. (The worms crawl in, the worms crawl out.) Scary Stories the movie just bounces right off."

David Fear of Rolling Stone gave the movie three stars out of five, commenting "It’s all a lot of chain-rattling, black-cat-screeching fun, though not such a blast that you don’t notice how generic and ramshackle the whole endeavor feels... The pity is that Scary Stories to Tell in the Dark will mostly be seen by jaded genre completists and nostalgic fortysomethings. Wrong demographic. You owe it to your kids to take them to this. It’s training-wheels horror done right." Aja Romano of Vox gave the film three and half points out of five and wrote "...the film leans all the way into the chance to tell a story beset with cultural anxieties of the past that strongly mirror those of the present. It’s far more like a classic piece of young adult fiction than the juvenile fiction it’s adapting; its focus isn’t on kids, but on teens who are coming of age in a turbulent, complicated, and often maliciously unjust world. Their supernatural monsters, in contrast, are culled from juvenile fears and fantasies. The resulting folkloric aesthetic makes Scary Stories’ brand of fantasy all the more effective as fun visual horror. But on a thematic level, it creates a discordance with the film's more adult social horrors, and the two elements never quite unify." A.A. Dowd of The A.V. Club gave the film B grade and wrote "Like scouts huddled around a campfire, each trying to send a bigger chill down the others’ spines, Scary Stories To Tell In The Dark keeps coming up with new gruesome attractions, piling one on top of the next. Yet as gross and spooky and, yes, occasionally frightening as these terror tactics get, they never quite cross over into the deep end of truly grown-up horror." The Times of India's Neil Soans gave the film three stars out of five, noting "The screenplay ends up as a jumble of unexplored ideas onscreen rather than a cohesive narrative. However, if you only enjoy horror films for creepy monsters, you’ll manage to get a kick or two."

Accolades

Sequel 
On April 23, 2020, it was announced that a sequel to the film is officially in development, with Øvredal returning to direct and Paramount Pictures (who absorbed CBS Films as part of the Viacom/CBS re-merger) distributing. Zoe Colletti, Michael Garza, Natalie Ganzhorn, and Dean Norris are set to reprise their roles with Dan and Kevin Hageman returning as writers and Guillermo del Toro returning as producer.

References

External links 
 
 
 

2010s ghost films
2010s supernatural horror films
2010s monster movies
2019 horror films
2019 films
American ghost films
American monster movies
American films about Halloween
American supernatural horror films
Canadian monster movies
Canadian supernatural horror films
Children's horror films
CBS Films films
Entertainment One films
Films based on horror novels
Films directed by André Øvredal
Films produced by Guillermo del Toro
Films scored by Marco Beltrami
Films set in the 1960s
Films set in 1966
Films set in 1968
Films set in Pennsylvania
Films shot in Toronto
Films with screenplays by Guillermo del Toro
Folk horror films
Halloween adventure films
Halloween horror films
Films with screenplays by The Hageman Brothers
2010s English-language films
2010s Canadian films
2010s American films